Eureka Day is a play by Jonathan Spector. It focuses on the debates around vaccination.

Productions
Eureka Day premiered at Aurora Theatre Company in Berkeley, California. 

The play opened off-Broadway on August 29, 2019. The cast included Tina Benko, KK Moggie, Thomas Jay Ryan, Brian Wiles and Elizabeth Carter.

A production will open at Old Vic in London on September 23, 2022, following previews from September 6. The cast will include Helen Hunt as Suzanne, Kirsten Foster as May, Mark McKinney as Don, Ben Schnetzer as Eli and Susan Kelechi Watson as Carina.

References 

Off-Broadway plays